A-412,997 is a drug which acts as a dopamine agonist that is used in scientific research. It is the first drug developed that is a highly selective agonist for the D4 subtype, with significantly improved selectivity over older D4-preferring compounds such as PD-168,077 and CP-226,269. In animal tests it improved cognitive performance in rats to a similar extent as methylphenidate, but without producing place preference or other signs of abuse liability. Also unlike other dopamine agonists, selective D4 agonists do not cause side effects such as sedation and nausea, and so might have advantages over older dopamine agonist drugs.

References 

Dopamine agonists
Acetanilides
Piperidines
2-Pyridyl compounds